Teodor Atanasov may refer to:
 Teodor Atanasov (footballer)
 Teodor Atanasov (basketball)